State Institute of Physical Education For Women, established in 1975, is an undergraduate women's college for physical education in Kolkata, West Bengal, India. This college is affiliated to the University of Calcutta. This college offers B.P. Ed and M.P.Ed degree.

See also 
List of colleges affiliated to the University of Calcutta
Education in India
Education in West Bengal

References

External links
http://www.sipew.org/

Educational institutions established in 1975
University of Calcutta affiliates
Universities and colleges in Howrah district
1975 establishments in West Bengal